Qiao Zhou (199 - 270), courtesy name Yunnan, was an official and scholar of the state of Shu Han during the Three Kingdoms period of China. He previously served under Liu Zhang, the Governor of Yi Province (covering present-day Sichuan and Chongqing) in the late Eastern Han dynasty before becoming a subject of the warlord Liu Bei, who established the Shu Han regime in 221.

During his lifetime Qiao Zhou was regarded as lacking talent and was not respected by many of his peers. Only Yang Xi regarded Qiao Zhou highly. Yang Xi even once said: "Like us, the later generations can never be as good as this great man." Because of this, Yang Xi earned praise from those individuals who also recognised Qiao Zhou for his talent.

Qiao Zhou served in the Shu government from the time when Liu Bei ascended the throne (in 221) to the fall of Shu in 263. He is remembered for persuading the Shu emperor Liu Shan to surrender to Wei in 263.

Assessments of Qiao Zhou's surrender stance
In the Records of the Three Kingdoms (Sanguozhi), the historian Chen Shou praised Qiao's proposal to Liu Shan for preserving the Liu ex-royal family and helping Shu Han. It can be argued that Chen's views reflect his position as a subordinate of the Western Jin dynasty and also because Qiao was Chen's teacher. Historians with different viewpoints, such as Sun Sheng, heavily criticized Qiao Zhou's stance of surrender, calling Qiao a "traitor".

Yi Zhongtian commented that Qiao's "treachery" was not due to his personality (Qiao was well known for his good moral conduct) but because of a difference in political stance. Qiao Zhou was the representative of the local Shu intelligentsia (士族) who had long been at odds with Shu Han's government due to:

The Shu government had long been mainly made up of "foreign" magistrates who competed against the local nobility for governmental posts and political power. Liu Yan, Liu Zhang, Liu Bei and their close associates were mostly not local Shu nobility. Zhuge Liang later enacted a "fair" talent enrolment process, which employed many local Shu scholars and intellectuals and so managed to earn their respect.  However he failed to completely resolve the conflict.
Zhuge Liang's fair and transparent rule of law was harmful for the nobility because it restricted their social privileges and prevented them from influencing local politics. Meanwhile, the nine-rank system of Cao Wei and later Western Jin enabled the nobility to recommend and promote their own scions, which was beneficial for the local Shu clans.
The Shu Han government relentlessly launched the northern expeditions against Cao Wei, resulted in heavy expenditure. Such expenditure was not only a major burden for the common people, but also was harmful for the Shu nobility since taxes were also imposed on them.

As a result, it is argued by critics of Qiao Zhou that by betraying the Shu Han state and surrendering to Cao Wei, Qiao Zhou's actions were beneficial for the local Shu nobility, who welcomed Cao Wei's invasion.

In Romance of the Three Kingdoms
In the 14th-century historical novel Romance of the Three Kingdoms, Qiao Zhou is depicted as an astrologer whose studies greatly aided Zhuge Liang during the Northern Expeditions against Shu's rival state Cao Wei.

See also
 Lists of people of the Three Kingdoms

References

 Chen, Shou (3rd century). Records of the Three Kingdoms (Sanguozhi).
 Luo, Guanzhong (14th century). Romance of the Three Kingdoms (Sanguo Yanyi).
 Pei, Songzhi (5th century). Annotations to Records of the Three Kingdoms (Sanguozhi zhu).

Year of birth unknown
270 deaths
Shu Han politicians
People from Langzhong
Politicians from Nanchong
3rd-century Chinese astronomers
Scientists from Sichuan
Shu Han essayists
Historians from Sichuan
People of Cao Wei
Jin dynasty (266–420) politicians
Shu Han historians
Jin dynasty (266–420) historians
3rd-century Chinese historians
Writers from Nanchong
Chinese classicists